Kristinn Ingi Valsson (born 6 June 1985) is an Icelandic alpine skier. He competed in the men's slalom at the 2006 Winter Olympics.

References

1985 births
Living people
Kristinn Ingi Valsson
Kristinn Ingi Valsson
Alpine skiers at the 2006 Winter Olympics
Place of birth missing (living people)
21st-century Icelandic people